Kurtistown is a census-designated place (CDP) in Hawaii County, Hawaii, United States, in the District of Puna. The population was 1,298 at the 2010 census, up from 1,157 at the 2000 census.

Geography
Kurtistown is located on the east side of the island of Hawaii at  (19.590584, -155.070142). It is bordered to the northeast by Keaau, to the southeast by Orchidlands Estates, to the south by Hawaiian Acres, and to the west by Mountain View. Hawaii Route 11 passes through the community, leading north  to Hilo and southwest  to Hawaii Volcanoes National Park.

Demographics

As of the census of 2010, there were 1,298 people in 476 households residing in the CDP. The racial makeup of the CDP was 19.49% White, 0.23% African American, 0.31% American Indian & Alaska Native, 35.82% Asian, 9.40% Native Hawaiian & Pacific Islander, 0.69% from other races, and 34.05% from two or more races. Hispanic or Latino of any race were 10.02% of the population.

There were 476 households, out of which 26.3% had children under the age of 18 living with them.  The average household size was 2.73.

In the Kurtistown CDP the population was spread out, with 22.6% under the age of 18, 8.9% from 18 to 24, 8.7% from 25 to 34, 18.9% from 35 to 49, 24.7% from 50 to 64, and 16.3% who were 65 years of age or older.  For every 100 females, there were 99.4 males.  For every 100 males there were 100.6 females.

The median income for a household in the CDP at the 2000 census was $46,012, and the median income for a family in 2000 was $51,176. Males had a median income in 2000 of $35,000 versus $26,875 for females. The per capita income for the CDP in 2000 was $16,528.  About 6.5% of families and 8.4% of the population were below the poverty line in 2000, including 7.2% of those under age 18 and 2.0% of those age 65 or over.

References

Census-designated places in Hawaii County, Hawaii
Populated places on Hawaii (island)